is a sumo video game developed by Tomcat System and published by Imagineer for the Super Famicom, which was released exclusively in Japan in 1993.

Reception
On release, Famicom Tsūshin scored the game a 20 out of 40.

See also
 List of sumo video games
 Wakanohana Masaru
 Takanohana Kōji

References

External links
 Wakataka Oozumou: Yume no Kyodai Taiketsu at superfamicom.org 
 若貴大相撲～夢の兄弟対決～ / Wakataka Oozumou: Yume no Kyodai Taiketsu at super-famicom.jp 

1993 video games
Imagineer games
Japan-exclusive video games
Super Nintendo Entertainment System games
Super Nintendo Entertainment System-only games
Sumo mass media
Tomcat System games
Fighting games
Video games set in Japan
Multiplayer and single-player video games
Video games developed in Japan